GR-127935 is a drug which acts as a selective antagonist at the serotonin receptors 5-HT1B and 5-HT1D. It has little effect when given by itself but blocks the antiaggressive effect of 5-HT1B agonists, and alters release of serotonin in the brain, as well as reducing drug-seeking behaviour in cocaine addicted rats.

See also
 Elzasonan

References

5-HT1 antagonists
Piperazines
Phenol ethers
Benzanilides
Oxadiazoles